Istituto Bancario San Paolo di Torino S.p.A., commonly known as just San Paolo, was an Italian bank. It was headquartered in Turin, Piedmont. The bank is the predecessor of Sanpaolo IMI, as well as the current largest bank in Italy in terms of total assets, Intesa Sanpaolo. The former owner of San Paolo bank, Compagnia di San Paolo, still significantly owned Intesa Sanpaolo. In 1998 the bank merged with Istituto Mobiliare Italiano to form Sanpaolo IMI.

History
The bank was founded by Compagnia di San Paolo (a brotherhood) in 1563. In early years the bank was a mount of piety. In 1991 Crediop became a subsidiary of the bank, which was sold to Dexia in 1999 by Sanpaolo IMI, the successor of the bank.

Compagnia di San Paolo remained as the major shareholders. In 1997 the brotherhood owned 20.54% of the bank, followed by Banco Santander (6.8%), Istituto Mobiliare Italiano (5%) and others.

In 1994 the bank absorbed Banca Provinciale Lombarda and Banco Lariano. In 1995 Sanpaolo absorbed Banca Nazionale delle Comunicazioni.

According to Ricerche e Studi, a subsidiary of Mediobanca, the bank was ranked the second in terms of client deposits in 1997, behind Banca Intesa (pro forma data). In 1998 the bank merged with Istituto Mobiliare Italiano to form Sanpaolo IMI.

Former shareholders of Sanpaolo received about 55.3% shares of the new company (or 775,184,948). Compagnia di San Paolo would own 16.4%.

References

Defunct banks of Italy
1563 establishments in Italy
Banks established in the 16th century
Companies established in the 1560s
1998 disestablishments in Italy
Banks disestablished in 1998
 *
Mounts of piety
Banco Santander
History of banking